Katoufs, an old Greek expression that means "making a face", is the title of an illustrated children's book and notebook art collection by Princess Marie of Greece (1876–1940). Katoufs first appeared in a book titled Katoufs published by Williams & Norgate, London in 1925.

The Katoufs art collection was first licensed to Spiegel Catalog, Inc. for reproduction as a line of bedding, bath, and infant room decor. Again in 2001, Katoufs was licensed to Andrews McMeel Publishing and appeared as little gift books, stationery, greeting cards and note cards.

References
A Romanov Diary, The Autobiography of H.I. & R.H. Grand Duchess George

Picture books
1925 children's books
Greek children's books